The alpine pine vole (Microtus multiplex) is a species of rodent in the family Cricetidae.
It is found in Austria, France, Italy, Serbia, Montenegro, Bosnia and Herzegowina (Una National Park) and Switzerland.

References

Musser, G. G. and M. D. Carleton. 2005. Superfamily Muroidea. pp. 894–1531 in Mammal Species of the World a Taxonomic and Geographic Reference. D. E. Wilson and D. M. Reeder eds. Johns Hopkins University Press, Baltimore.

Microtus
Mammals described in 1905
Taxonomy articles created by Polbot